The Via Nova Quartet is a French string quartet ensemble established in 1968.

History 
Founded in 1968 by musicians who had met at the Cyrne Arte festival (Corsica) four years earlier, it first took the festival's name. Its repertoire ranges from classical composers to contemporary classical music. It was subsidized in 1976 by the French Ministry of Culture.

Members 
 Jean Mouillère, first violin
 Jean-Pierre Sabouret (1968, then from 1975), Hervé le Floch (1968-1971), Alain Moglia (1971-1975), second violin
 René Jeanneray (1968–1969), Gérard Caussé (1969-1971), Claude Naveau (1971-) viola
 René Benedetti (1968–1971), Roland Pidoux (1971-1978), Jean-Marie Gamard (1978-) cello

Premieres 
 André Casanova's string quartet n° 3 (1989)
 Jacques Castérède's pro tempore passionis string quartet  (1989)

Sources 
 Alain Pâris Dictionnaire des interprètes, Bouquins/Laffont 1989,

References

External links 
 Discography (Discogs)
 Via Nova Quartet - MOZART, Quartet in D minor K.421 (YouTube)
 Quatuor Via Nova on data.bnf.fr

Musical groups established in 1968
French string quartets